The Mauritius starling (Cryptopsar ischyrhynchus) is an extinct species of starling, described in 2014 by Julian P. Hume, based on subfossils from Mauritius. The holotype mandible was discovered in 1904, but was hidden in a museum drawer for over a hundred years, hence the genus name. The Mauritius starling was shown to be closer to the Rodrigues starling than to the hoopoe starling of Réunion.

References

External links
 
 

Birds described in 2014
Bird extinctions since 1500
Birds of Mauritius
Endemic fauna of Mauritius
Extinct birds of Indian Ocean islands
Holocene extinctions
Late Quaternary prehistoric birds
Sturnidae
Extinct animals of Mauritius
Fossil taxa described in 2014